Rua Uruguaiana ("Uruguayan Street") is a popular shopping street in Rio de Janeiro, Brazil.

History
In 1994 on Uruguaiana, Rio de Janeiro mayor César Maia inaugurated the Uruguaiana Popular Market (also known as "camelódromo da Uruguaiana") to shelter the street vendors that worked nearby. Due to the common practice of selling illegal counterfeit products, the area is usually a stage for police operations.

The market is the mecca of piracy in Rio de Janeiro.

See also 
Rua 25 de Março

References

Streets in Rio de Janeiro (city)